Gina's Laughing Gear was a special programming slot which was presented by Gina Yashere. It was shown on Friday afternoons on BBC One and repeated on Saturday on the CBBC Channel. The purpose was to showcase new CBBC comedy at the time.

The running gag in the slot was that Gina "hacks" the CBBC transmission in her claim to try to be a CBBC presenter. She often made desperate attempts to win over the audience, none of which were very effective.

Episodes

Series 1 (2007)

References

BBC children's television shows
2000s British satirical television series
2000s British children's television series